America's Challenge is a yacht that participated in the 1997–98 Whitbread Round the World Race skippered by Ross Field, but did not finish.

Career
America's Challenge was designed by Alan Andrews for Neil Barth's syndicate and built by Eric Goetz Custom Boats.

America's Challenge participated in the 1997–98 Whitbread Round the World Race skippered by Ross Field, but did not finish.

References

Volvo Ocean Race yachts
Sailing yachts of the United States
Volvo Ocean 60 yachts
1990s sailing yachts